Ibrahim Zakaria is the name of:

 Ibrahim Zakaria (scout), Syrian scout leader
 Ibrahim Zakaria (trade unionist) (1929–1993), Sudanese trade union leader